Richard Emery may refer to:
 Richard David Emery, American lawyer
 Richard R. Emery, bishop of the Episcopal Diocese of North Dakota 
 Dick Emery (Richard Gilbert Emery), English comedian and actor